KRIG-FM 104.9 FM is a radio station licensed to Nowata, Oklahoma, which broadcasts a country music format and is owned by KCD Enterprises, Inc.

References

External links
KRIG-FM's website

RIG-FM
Country radio stations in the United States